Knut Ødegård (born 6 November 1945) is a Norwegian poet.

Biography 

Born in 1945 in Molde, Norway, Ødegård made his poetic debut in 1967. Since then he has published more than fifty books, many volumes of poetry, two novels for young adults, two books about Iceland, a play, and several reinterpretations. His own works are recognized internationally as deeply original and high quality poetry and his poetry books are translated into 42 languages (2022), among these five separate collections in English.

He was the founder and president of the Bjørnson Festival, the Norwegian International Literature Festival, held in homage to Nobel laureate Bjørnstjerne Bjørnson, for a decade. He was the founder and president of Bjørnstjerne Bjørnson-Akademiet, The Norwegian Academy of Literature and Freedom of Expression, 2003–2015.

He shares his time between a home in Molde and another in Reykjavík, Iceland.

Selected works
1982: Wind over Romsdal, poems, translated by George Johnston.
1989: *Bee-Buzz, Salmon Leap (1989), poems, translated by George Johnston.
2002: Missa, poems, translated by Brian McNeil
2005: Judas Iscariot and Other Poems, translated by Brian McNeil
2009: "Selected Poems", translated by Brian McNeil

In Norwegian:
Drøymaren, vandraren og kjelda. Lyrikk. Noregs Boklag, 1967
Konsert i eit kvitt hus. Lyrikk. Noregs Boklag, 1968
I pensjonatet. Lyrikk. Noregs Boklag, 1970
Det mørke regnet. Lyrikk, Aschehoug, 1972
Einar Bragi: Regn i mai. Gjendikting, Noregs Boklag, 1973
Færøysk lyrikk. Gjendiktningar av færøysk notidslyrikk med essay. Aschehoug 1974
Gyula Illyés: Dikt i utval. Gjendikting (s.m. Vince Sulyok). Aschehoug, 1974
Fuglen og draumen. Barnebok. Noregs Boklag, 1974
Ólafur Jóhann Sigurðsson: Ved brunnane. Gjendikting. Aschehoug, 1976
Hoggormen. Skodespel. Dreyer, 1977
Vind gjennom Romsdal. Lyrikk. Noregs Boklag, 1978
Bjørnstjerne Bjørnson, i utvalg av Knut Ødegård. Dikt. Den norske Bokklubben, 1979. 
Broder Eysteinn: Lilja. Gjendikting med essay. Tiden Norsk Forlag, 1980
Einarr Skúlason: Geisli. Gjendikting med essay. Tiden Norsk Forlag, 1982
Biesurr, laksesprang. Lyrikk. Cappelen, 1983
Ørneblodet. Ungdomsbok. Tiden Norsk Forlag, 1983
Gudehovet. Ungdomsbok. Cappelen, 1984
Leid Henrik Ibsen ad Petri Gaut. Essay. 1989
Moderne islandske dikt. Gjendiktingar med essay. Samlaget, 1990
Kinomaskinist. Lyrikk. Cappelen, 1991
Molde, mitt Molde. Dikt og prologar. Molde kommune, 1992.
Island, øya mellom øst og vest. Sakprosa. Aschehoug, 1992
Buktale. Lyrikk. Cappelen, 1994
Matthias Johannessen: Om vindheim vide. Gjendikting. Cappelen forlag, 1994
Dikt i utval (v/Kolbeinn Falkeid og Edvard Hoem). Lyrikk. Cappelen, 1995
Milan Richter: Røter i lufta. Gjendikting med essay. Cappelen, 1996
Missa. Lyrikk. Cappelen, 1998
Island. Fra saga til samtid. Sakprosa. Aschehoug, 1998
Matthías Johannessen: Salmer i atomalderen. Gjendikting. Cappelen, 2002
Nysilt. CD s.m. Inger Johanne Brunvoll Band, 2002
Stephensen-huset. Lyrikk. Cappelen, 2003
Ödön von Horváth: Historier frå Wienerskogen. Drama. Samlaget, 2003
Kringsjå. Dikt i utval (v/Thorvald Steen). Lyrikk. Cappelen, 2005
Grøne dikt. 9 moderne irske lyrikarar. Antologi. Gjendikting med essay (s.m. Jostein Sæbøe). Cappelen, 2005
Står om enn tårnene faller. Kyrkjespel i høve Molde domkyrkjes 50-års jubileum. 2007
Jóhann Hjálmarsson: Storm er et vakkert ord. Gjendikting. Solum forlag, 2007
Knut A. Ødegård sen.: Kornåker under himmelen. Dikt og essay. Fræna kommune, 2009
Det blomstra så sinnssjukt. Lyrikk. Cappelen Damm, 2009
Åsmund Sveen: Guten låg i graset. Dikt i utval ved Knut Ødegård og Knut Imerslund, 2009
Glacovi od cever, covremena, norveska poesija, moderne norsk lyrikk på makedonsk, utval, redigering og innleiingsessay (s.m. Yasminka Markovska). Struga, 2009
Friedrich Schiller: Don Carlos. Gjendikting. Samlaget, 2010
Eksempelet Island: om hvordan nykapitalismen angriper et folk. Sakprosa, red. og artiklar. Arneberg forlag, 2010
Olav den hellige. Spor etter helgenkongen. Essays og gjendiktingar (s.m. Lars Roar Langslet. Forlaget Press, 2011
Mennesket i sorteringssamfunnet. Sakprosa, red. og bidrag. Arneberg forlag, 2011
Fine spinn av draumar. Makedonske dikt. Antologi. Gjendiktingar og essay (s.m. Yasminka Markovska). Dreyers forlag, 2011
Edda-dikt I, Voluspå og Håvåmål. Gjendikting, essay og kommentarar. Cappelen Damm, 2013
Edda-dikt II, Gudedikt. Gjendikting, essay og kommentarar, Cappelen Damm, 2014
Liabonden. Prosatekstar. Via Media 2014.
Gerður Kristný: Blodhest. Gjendikting med essay. Nordsjøforlaget, 2014.
Edda-dikt III, Heltedikt 1. Gjendikting, essay og kommentarar. Cappelen Damm, 2015
Drankarar og galningar. Dikt i utval (v/Endre Ruset og Steinar Opstad). Cappelen Damm, 2015
Edda-dikt IV, Heltedikt, del 2. Gjendikting, essay og kommentarar. Cappelen Damm, 2016
UFO og englar over Holmarka. Prosatekstar.  Via Media 2016
Tida er inne. Lyrikk. Cappelen Damm, 2017
Missa. Lydbok. ebok.no, 2017,
Fuglespråk, roman. Cappelen Damm, 2019.
Sirkusdirektøren - og andre dikt, lyrikk, Cappelen Damm, 2020.
Teikn i sol og måne, prosatekster, Via Media, 2022.

Distinctions
Ødegård is appointed a Norwegian State Scholar by the Norwegian Parliament as well as a Consul General for the Republic of Macedonia in Norway (1997) and an honorary professor of literature at the Mongolian State University of Arts and Culture, and he has received many prizes and awards for his literary work.

National orders
 : Knight 1. class of the Royal Norwegian Order of Merit (1997) by the King of Norway

Foreign orders
 : Equestrian Order of the Holy Sepulchre of Jerusalem (2009), knighted by Cardinal Foley. Knight Commander (2016). Grand Officer (with star) (2022)
 : Knight Commander of the Order of the Falcon by the President of Iceland (1995). Commander with Star (2017).
 Sovereign Military Order of Malta, knighted 2021.

Other
  Bastian Prize (1984) by the Norwegian Association of Literary Translators
  Anders Jahre Cultural Prize (2001)
  Jan Smrek Prize (2009) for his literary work in Bratislava, Slovakia
  Dobloug Prize (2011) by the Swedish Academy
 Golden Medal, 1. Prize, World Congress of Poets, Taiwan (2010)
 The Goden Key of Smederevo, Serbia (2014)
 International poetry prize Le Prix Special and Mihai Eminescu medal, Academie Internationale "Mihai Eminescu", Romania (2015)
 International poetry prize The Golden Grape, Kosovo (2016)
 Ulaanbaatar international poetry prize, Mongolia (2017)

References

1945 births
Living people
Norwegian male poets
People from Molde
Knights of the Holy Sepulchre
20th-century Norwegian poets
20th-century Norwegian male writers
21st-century Norwegian poets
21st-century Norwegian male writers
Translators of the Poetic Edda